Chaiwat Nak-iem (born July 18, 1978) is a Thai retired professional footballer who played as a defender.

International career

In 2012 Chaiwat was called up to the national team by Winfried Schäfer to the 2014 FIFA World Cup qualification – AFC Third Round.

International

Honours

Club
Army United
 Thai Division 1 League: 2004-05

References

External links
 

Nak-iem, Chaiwat
Nak-iem, Chaiwat
Chaiwat Nak-iem
Chaiwat Nak-iem
Association football defenders
Chaiwat Nak-iem
Chaiwat Nak-iem
Chaiwat Nak-iem
Chaiwat Nak-iem